Mark Feinstein is a linguist and professor emeritus of linguistics at Hampshire College. He is known for his works on phonology and evolution of language.

References

Phonologists
Living people
Hampshire College faculty
American cognitive scientists
Linguists from the United States
Year of birth missing (living people)